Pseudagrion coeleste (catshead sprite) is a species of damselfly in family Coenagrionidae.

Distribution
Found in Angola, Botswana, Malawi, Namibia, South Africa, Zambia, Zimbabwe.

Habitat
Pseudagrion coeleste favours freshwater marshes and pools with emergent vegetation.

Gallery

References

External links

 Pseudagrion coeleste on African Dragonflies and Damselflies Online

Coenagrionidae
Insects described in 1947
Taxonomy articles created by Polbot
Taxobox binomials not recognized by IUCN